Bryant's woodrat (Neotoma bryanti) is a species of new-world rodent in the family Cricetidae native to the Southwestern United States and Mexico.

References

Musser, G. G. and M. D. Carleton. 2005. Superfamily Muroidea. pp. 894–1531 in Mammal Species of the World a Taxonomic and Geographic Reference. D. E. Wilson and D. M. Reeder eds. Johns Hopkins University Press, Baltimore.

Neotoma
Mammals described in 1887
Taxonomy articles created by Polbot
Taxa named by Clinton Hart Merriam